BeBe Sweetbriar is an American drag singer, actor, community activist, and host based in San Francisco, California. She has released two dance records, Save Me and Free to Be Me. BeBe is also host of multiple parties, such as Porno, a quarterly dance party and Play Trivia with BeBe at Harveys, San Francisco. She hosts a weekly webTV talk show, It′s Everything, on the Talk Stream Network.

Life and career 

BeBe Sweetbriar was born and raised in Sacramento, California by Joan and Ace Junious. His given name is Kevin-Lee Junious. He is the youngest of four siblings, two sisters and one brother. He has two daughters, Alessandra and Cydney.
BeBe started performing at age 5. He learned how to play the trumpet, trombone, and baritone horn.

She stepped away from music and performing until 2006. This is the year Kevin-Lee created BeBe Sweetbriar, his drag persona.

On May 18, 2013, San Francisco Pride selected Bebe as the parade's Community Grand Marshal over Bradley Manning.

BeBe's collaboration with Knife & Fork and Leo Frappier, "UNITY," spent 9 weeks on Billboard's Dance Club Songs chart peaking at position 25 on October 21, 2017.

Activism 

BeBe has performed for various fundraisers to benefit many LGBT organizations including AIDS Housing Alliance, Under One Roof, Larkin Street Youth, Lyric, GLAAD, Richmond/Ermet AIDS Foundation.

Discography 

 "UNITY" (2017)
 Come Play With Me (Ode to Grace Jones) (2013)
 Here We Go (2012)
 Show It Off (2012)
 Stand Up (2012)
 Save Me (2006)
 Free to Be Me (2006)

Filmography

Awards and honors

 2008, Miss Gay San Francisco
 2008, Miss Desperate Diva
 2013, Community Grand Marshal, San Francisco Pride Parade
 2017, Most Notable Drag Queen, The San Francisco Nightlife Awards (a.k.a. The Nitey Awards)

References 

American women comedians
Actresses from San Francisco
American drag queens
Living people
American LGBT rights activists
American LGBT writers
1962 births
Comedians from California
Activists from California
21st-century American comedians
21st-century American women
21st-century American LGBT people
American LGBT comedians